Omar Camporese was the defending champion but lost in the first round to Jan Apell.

Boris Becker won in the final 7–6(11–9), 4–6, 6–2 against Alexander Volkov.

Seeds

  Stefan Edberg (second round)
  Boris Becker (champion)
  Ivan Lendl (second round)
  Omar Camporese (first round)
  Goran Prpić (quarterfinals)
  John McEnroe (semifinals)
  Alexander Volkov (final)
  Jonas Svensson (first round)

Draw

Final

Top half

Bottom half

External links
 ITF tournament edition details

Singles
1992 ATP Tour